The Palacký Bridge (1876) is a bridge in Prague. It is one of the oldest functioning bridges over the Vltava in Prague after the Charles Bridge.

It was built as the third major bridge shortly after the 1868 opening of the Franz Joseph Bridge, designed by Rowland Mason Ordish which was damaged in 1941 and dismantled in 1946.

Josef Václav Myslbek created statues of four pairs of legendary couples for the bridge: Ctirad and Šárka, Libuše and Přemysl, Lumír and Píseň , and Záboj and Slavoj. These were later removed to the grounds of the Vyšehrad.

References

External links
 

Bridges completed in 1876
Bridges in Prague
Bridges over the Vltava
New Town, Prague
Smíchov